The 2019 World Archery Youth Championships was the 17th edition of World Youth Archery Championships. The event was held in Madrid, Spain 19-25 August 2019, and was organised by World Archery. Junior events were held for those under 21, and Cadet for those under 18. Seven world records were broken during the course of the championships.  The best performing nation was South Korea.

Medal summary

Junior

Recurve

Compound

Cadet

Recurve

Compound

Medal table

References

External links
 Results Book

2019
International archery competitions hosted by Spain
Sports competitions in Madrid
World Youth Championship
World Archery
World Archery Youth Championships